Mahishi Assembly constituency is an assembly constituency in Saharsa district in the Indian state of Bihar.

Overview
As per Delimitation of Parliamentary and Assembly constituencies Order, 2008, No. 77 Mahishi Assembly constituency is composed of the following: Nauhatta and Sattar Katiya community development blocks; Baghwa, Birgaun, Manwar, Telwa West, Telwa East, Bhalahi, Kundah, Mahisarho, Telhar, Pastpar and Arapatti gram panchayats of Mahishi CD Block.

Mahishi Assembly constituency is part of No. 13 Madhepura (Lok Sabha constituency) .

Members of Legislative Assembly

Election results

1977-2010
In the 2016 state assembly election, Dr. Abdul Ghafoor of RJD won the Mahishi assembly seat defeating his nearest rival Chandan Kumar Sah of RLSP. In 2010 state assembly elections, Dr. Abdul Ghafoor of RJD won the Mahishi assembly seat defeating his nearest rival Raj Kumar Sah of JD(U). Contests in most years were multi cornered but only winners and runners up are being mentioned. Gunjeshwar Sah of JD(U) defeated Surendra Yadav representing RJD in October 2005. Surendra Yadav, contesting as an Independent, defeated Dr. Abdul Ghafoor of RJD in February 2005. Dr. Abdul Ghafoor of RJD defeated Surendra Yadav representing JD(U) in 2000. Dr. Abdul Ghafoor of JD defeated Lahtan Choudhary of Congress in 1995. Anand Mohan of JD defeated Lahtan Choudhary of Congress in 1990. Lahtan Choudhary of Congress defeated Devanand Yadav of LD in 1985 and Satya Narayan Yadav of Congress (U) in 1980. Parameshwar Kumar of JP defeated Lahtan Choudhary of Congress in 1977.

2020

References

External links
 

Assembly constituencies of Bihar
Politics of Saharsa district